James William "Bill" Bruce (born 11 January 1952) is a British mathematician whose main contributions are in singularity theory and related areas.

Mathematical career 

Bill completed his PhD thesis, titled Some Natural Whitney Stratifications, in 1978 at the University of Liverpool under the supervision of C T C Wall. Following domestic and international appointments, he was appointed to a chair in pure mathematics at the University of Liverpool in 1990.

Administrative career 

Whilst at the University of Liverpool, Bill served as head of mathematics for eight years. He then became Pro Vice-Chancellor with responsibility for the academic budget and learning and teaching, before joining the University of Hull as Deputy Vice-Chancellor in 2004. In 2009 he joined Edge Hill University as Pro Vice-Chancellor with responsibility for the university's academic portfolio.

References 

1952 births
Living people
English mathematicians
Academics of Edge Hill University
Alumni of the University of Liverpool
Academics of the University of Liverpool
Academics of the University of Hull